In biology, the BBCH-scale for currants describes the phenological development of currants, such as blackcurrants and redcurrants, using the BBCH-scale.

The phenological growth stages and BBCH-identification keys of currants are:

Notes

References
 

BBCH-scale